A Little Kiss is a 2005 Iranian drama film directed by Bahman Farmanara.

Plot 
A writer returns to Iran after many years and goes to the house of another friend who is also a writer. They start a trip to several cities in Iran...

Cast 
 Reza Kianian
 Jamshid Mashayekhi
 Hushang Harirchiyan
 Hedieh Tehrani
 Jamshid Hashempour
 Fatemeh Motamed-Arya
 Fakhri Khorvash
 Babak Hamidian
 Payam Dehkordi
 Maryam Saadat
 Hossein Kasbian
 Ahmad Saatchian
 Hedayat Hashemi
 Mehdi Safavi

References

External links

2005 films
2000s Persian-language films
2005 drama films
Iranian drama films